Hussain Ali Bahzad (Arabic:حسين علي بهزاد; born 8 April 1998), is a Qatari professional footballer who plays as a defender.

Career statistics

Club

Notes

References

1998 births
Living people
Qatari footballers
Association football defenders
Al Sadd SC players
Al-Shamal SC players
Qatar Stars League players
Qatari Second Division players